Zyrinx was a video game developer founded in 1992 in Copenhagen, Denmark. It consisted exclusively of people who had been active in the Amiga demo scene in the late 1980s and early 1990s, including composer Jesper Kyd.

The first game developed by Zyrinx was Subterrania for the Sega Mega Drive. During the development, the team relocated to Boston. Later, the team developed the games Red Zone and Scorcher. Zyrinx's 3D rendering technology was showcased in a Sega 32X promotion video. The team dissolved in 1998 because their publisher Scavenger went bankrupt.

In 1998, the Zyrinx team reformed under the name Reto-Moto and went on to create IO Interactive and the Hitman series of games.  In April 2008 the Reto-Moto team announced they had reformed the company and are working on multiplayer focused games.

References 

Video game companies established in 1992
Video game companies disestablished in 1998
Defunct video game companies of Denmark
Danish companies established in 1992
1998 disestablishments in Denmark